Evntlive is an interactive digital concert venue that allows music fans worldwide to stream concerts to their computer, tablet, or phone. Based in Redwood City, CA, EVNTLIVE Beta launched on April 15, 2013. EVNTLIVE provides users with the ability to switch camera angles, view All Access interviews and clips from artists, buy music, and chat with other online concert-goers in the in-app feature. Users can watch live and on-demand concerts with both free and pay-per-view concerts offered.

In its first two months, EVNTLIVE has streamed live performances of popular artists ranging from Bon Jovi to Wale, as well as music festivals such as Taste of Country and Mountain Jam; including performances by The Lumineers, Gary Clark Jr., Phil Lesh & Friends, Primus, and more.

About the Platform 

EvntLive is an HTML5, web-based platform available on laptops, iPads, and mobile devices. Users must register for a free account on Evntlive’s website in order to reserve tickets and access live and on-demand content. Once they reserve tickets, they can view All Access features from their favorite artists or bands, purchase music, and interact with other online audience members using  Buzz.  Users can also switch between alternate camera angles as though they are on the concert floor - sharing the experience with their friends online in real-time.

EvntLive was acquired by Yahoo in December 2013

Artists 

Bon Jovi 
Wale
Escape the Fate
The Parlotones

Taste of Country Music Festival 

Trace Adkins
Willie Nelson 
Justin Moore 
Montgomery Gentry
Craig Campbell
Blackberry Smoke 
Gloriana 
Dustin Lynch 
LoCash Cowboys 
Rachel Farley 
Parmalee 
Joe Nichols

Mountain Jam Music Festival

The Lumineers
Primus
Widespread Panic
Gov't Mule
Phil Lesh
The Avett Brothers
Dispatch
Rubblebucket
Michael Franti
Jackie Greene
Deer Tick
Gary Clark Jr.
ALO 
The London Souls
Nicki Bluhm
Amy Helm
The Lone Bellow 
The Revivalists
Swear and Shake
Roadkill Ghost Choir
Michael Bernard Fitzgerald

Michele Clark 's Sunset Sessions
Semi Precious Weapons
Dale Earnhardt Jr. Jr.

DigiTour Media 
Pentatonix 
Allstar Weekend
Tyler Ward

Launch Music Festival

References

External links 
 
Company profile

Web applications
American music websites